Diceratura infantana is a species of moth of the family Tortricidae. It is found in France, Portugal, Spain, Morocco and Algeria.

The wingspan is 9–11 mm. Adults are on wing from April to July.

References

Moths described in 1899
Cochylini